The Kachin woolly bat (Kerivoula kachinensis) is a species of bat found in Southeast Asia.

Taxonomy and etymology
It was initially described as a new species in 2004.
Its species name "kachinensis" is derived from Kachin State—the state in Myanmar where it was first documented.

Description
Its fur is grayish-brown.
Its ears are large and hairless.
Its skull has a flattened appearance.

Biology and ecology
It is nocturnal, roosting during the day and foraging at night.
The state of its flattened skull led some researchers to hypothesize that during the day it roosts in small, constricted spaces.

Range and habitat
It was first documented in Myanmar in 2004, but its range was quickly expanded to Laos, Cambodia, Vietnam, and Thailand after documentation in 2006.

Conservation
It is currently assessed as least concern by the IUCN—its lowest conservation priority.
It meets the criteria for this assessment because it has a large range, no major threats to this species have been identified, and it is not likely to be declining quickly.

References

External links
An image of this species

Mammals described in 2004
Bats of Southeast Asia
Kerivoulinae